Nicholas Sambourn (fl. 1394–1395), of Lushill, Wiltshire and Fernham, Berkshire (now Oxfordshire), was an English politician.

He was a Member (MP) of the Parliament of England for Chippenham in 1394 and for Malmesbury in 1395.

References

Year of birth missing
Year of death missing
English MPs 1394
Members of the Parliament of England for Chippenham
Members of the Parliament of England for Malmesbury
People from Shrivenham
English MPs 1395